Bob Carroll may refer to:

Bob Carroll (author) (1936–2009), sports author and historian
Bob Carroll (footballer) (1941–2021), Australian rules footballer
Bob Carroll Jr. (1918–2007), television writer
Bob Carroll (singer/actor) (1918–1994), singer and stage, television, and film actor
Bobby Carroll (1938–2016), Scottish football player
Robert L. Carroll (born 1938), vertebrate paleontologist
Robert Todd Carroll (1945–2016), writer, academic and skeptic

See also
Robert Carroll (disambiguation)